Ek Se Badh Kar Ek is an Indian show launched in 1995 on Doordarshan. The show was sponsored by BPL, and initially directed by Mukul Anand.

The initial episodes of the serial were written by journalists Madhulika Verma and Rauf Ahmed.

The programme's protagonist is Antara, played by Kartika Rane, who is a love interest of two of her uncle's tenants, played by Tiku Talsania and Ravi Baswani, living in the house haunted by a ghost named Raja.

After Mukul Anand's death, the production house was taken over by BR Films, and the series was then directed by Ravi Chopra.

Cast 
 Kartika Rane as Antra
 Tiku Talsania as Brij Mohan
 Ravi Baswani as Rahul
 Jagdeep as Contractor Khanna
 Asrani as Raja (Ghost)
 Rajesh Puri as Kanti Lal
 Shankar Mahadevan

References 

DD National original programming
Indian comedy television series
1995 Indian television series debuts
Ghosts in television